David Timothy Dreier OAE (/draɪər/; born July 5, 1952) is an American businessman, philanthropist, and politician who served as a Republican member of the United States House of Representatives from California from 1981 to 2013. He was one of the youngest members ever elected to the United States Congress. Dreier was the youngest chairman of the House Rules Committee in U.S. history, serving from 1999 to 2007 and from 2011 to 2013. He was instrumental in passing the North American Free Trade Agreement (NAFTA) in 1993.  After leaving Congress, Dreier served on the Foreign Affairs Policy Board under President Barack Obama. He served as the chairman of the Tribune Publishing Company from 2019 to 2020. Dreier is also founder and chair of the Fallen Journalists Memorial Foundation.

U.S. House of Representatives

Elections

Early career
In 1978, Dreier ran for the United States House of Representatives at the age of 25. He challenged incumbent Democrat James Fredrick Lloyd, who had first won in a Republican-leaning district in 1974. Though unknown and living in Phillips Hall at Claremont McKenna College, Dreier lost by 54% to 46%, less than expected.

In 1980, Dreier ran again and defeated Lloyd 52% to 45%, winning on the coattails of former California Governor Ronald Reagan's presidential election. Dreier was sworn into office as one of the youngest members of the House of Representatives in U.S. history.

After the 1980 United States Census, his district was renumbered to the 33rd. Dreier defeated Congressman Wayne Grisham 57% to 43% in the Republican primary of 1982. Dreier became the first person ever to defeat two incumbent members of Congress in back to back elections. He won the 1982 general election with 65% of the vote. He won re-election every two years after that with at least 57% of the vote until his 2004 re-election. His district was renumbered to the 28th after the 1990 United States Census and to the 26th district after the 2000 United States Census.

2004 election
In 2004, Dreier faced strong criticism for his position on illegal immigration from opponent Cynthia Matthews and several talk radio hosts who felt he was not tough enough on illegal immigrants.

Dreier won with 54% of the vote.

After 2004
In 2006, he won reelection in a rematch against Matthews 57% to 38%, despite Republicans losing the majority that year.

In 2008, Dreier won reelection against Democrat Russ Warner with 53% of the vote.

In 2010, he defeated Warner in a rematch with 54% of the vote. Dreier ceased all campaign fundraising for more than a year, leading many to believe that he was planning to leave Congress.

After the 2010 United States Census, the voter-created California Citizens Redistricting Commission renumbered Dreier's district as the 31st district, and reconfigured it as a Democratic-leaning, majority-Latino district. Dreier chose not to run for reelection in 2012 and encouraged his Republican colleague Gary Miller to move into the 31st after Miller's old district was merged with the district of another Republican, Ed Royce.

Tenure

House leadership 
Dreier is the youngest chairman of the House Rules Committee in U.S. history. As well as being the only Californian to hold that position, he is the third-longest-serving chairman of the Rules Committee and the longest-serving chairman since 1967. When the Democrats gained control of the House in the 2006 midterm elections, Dreier served as ranking member for the 110th and 111th Congresses. With the Republicans regaining control of the House in the 2010 midterm elections, Dreier again assumed the chairmanship during the 112th Congress.

Beginning with Dreier's chairmanship in 1999, the chairman of the Rules Committee became part of the nine-member elected Republican leadership.

Following the indictment of House Majority Leader Tom DeLay on September 28, 2005, House Speaker Dennis Hastert asked Dreier to assume temporarily the position of majority leader, as Dreier had consistently adhered to the views of the Republican leadership on many issues and would have been willing to relinquish the title should DeLay have returned to the position. However, rank-and-file Republican representatives disapproved of the choice of Dreier allegedly because many conservative members believed that he was "too politically moderate". According to Dreier spokeswoman Jo Maney, Dreier did not seek the temporary Majority Leader position because he "would have had to give up his chairmanship of the Rules Committee to move to another position, and that's not something that he wanted to do". The position instead went to then-Majority Whip Roy Blunt of Missouri, though both Dreier and then-Deputy Majority Whip Eric Cantor of Virginia shared in some duties.

Trade 

Along with House colleagues Jim Kolbe and Jerry Lewis, Dreier was the first member of Congress to propose a North American free trade agreement in 1987. He was instrumental in the creation and passage of what became NAFTA in 1993. During the signing ceremony for NAFTA, President Bill Clinton recognized Dreier's contribution to the ultimate success of the legislation.

Dreier opposed President Donald Trump's threats to abandon NAFTA, instead advocating for an updated NAFTA, which would include digital trade, among other subjects.

Dreier has been a longstanding supporter of closer ties between the United States and the countries of Latin America and has met frequently with executive and legislative branch leaders throughout the region. He has received the nation's highest honors from the presidents of Colombia, Mexico, and Nicaragua. On August 28, 2007, while building support for the United States–Colombia Free Trade Agreement, Dreier addressed the Colombian parliament. Dreier drew criticism from some opposition lawmakers when he sat on the edge of a podium during informal remarks to the legislators. Dreier later apologized and insisted he intended no disrespect. In comments released on August 30, 2007, Dreier said, "I meant absolutely no offense. I simply wanted to demonstrate my warm feeling and affection."

Dreier also founded the bipartisan House Trade Working Group, working closely with five American presidents of both parties on every free trade agreement into which the United States has entered. Dreier was a member of the Republican Main Street Partnership.

Foreign Affairs 
Dreier attended and led congressional delegations (CODELs) to dozens of nations during his tenure. He was the founder and first chairman of the House Democracy Partnership (HDP), which works to strengthen parliaments in new and re-emerging democracies on six continents.

Transportation 
Dreier supported the expansion of public transportation in his district. He secured federal funding for the Metro Gold Line, connecting Downtown Los Angeles and Pasadena via light rail.

Gay rights
Dreier initially supported the bipartisan Defense of Marriage Act, signed into law by President Bill Clinton in 1996. Joining columnists like William Raspberry in opposing "thought police," Dreier voted against the Matthew Shepard Act that expanded federal hate-crimes law to include crimes motivated by a victim's actual or perceived gender, sexual orientation, gender identity, or disability. Dreier initially supported the Don't ask, don't tell policy, which prevented LGBT members of the armed forces from serving openly. However, in December 2010, Dreier voted in favor of legislation that repealed the policy. Dreier opposed a constitutional amendment to ban same-sex marriage.

Other activities 
Dreier served as the co-chair of Arnold Schwarzenegger's 2003 California gubernatorial campaign. He also was the chairman of his transition team following the election. Dreier was a national co-chair of Mayor Rudy Giuliani's 2008 presidential bid.

He served as parliamentarian for four Republican National Conventions.

Committee assignments
Chairman of the Committee on Rules (1999–2007, 2011–2013)

Committee on Rules (1991–2013)
Subcommittee on Legislative and Budget Process
Subcommittee on Rules and the Organization of the House
Committee on Banking, Finance and Urban Affairs (July 1981–1991)
Committee on Government Operations (January 1981–July 1981)
Committee on Small Business (1981–1991)

Caucus memberships
International Conservation Caucus
 Sportsmen's Caucus
 U.S.-Mexico Congressional Caucus (co-chair)
 Zero Capital Gains Tax Caucus

After Congress 
On February 29, 2012, Dreier announced that upon completion of his current term he would not seek re-election. Upon leaving Congress, Dreier, in an unprecedented move, joined the Obama Administration from 2013 to 2015, serving as a member of the Foreign Affairs Policy Board.

Dreier is founder of the Dreier Roundtable at Claremont McKenna College (his alma mater), where he serves as a trustee. In 2013, Dreier was elected to the board of trustees of the California Institute of Technology (Caltech) in Pasadena, California. He serves on the Space Innovation Council at the Jet Propulsion Laboratory (JPL) and is a member of the Thirty Meter Telescope (TMT) working group.

Dreier also became chairman of the Annenberg-Dreier Commission at Sunnylands, which aims to promote the free flow of goods, services, capital, information, ideas, and people throughout the greater Pacific. He is a distinguished fellow at the Brookings Institution, a member of the Council on Foreign Relations, and a leading member of the board of directors of the International Republican Institute. He also serves on the boards of the Los Angeles Mission Foundation and James Madison's Montpelier. Dreier is an executive producer of the 2020 documentary Ending Disease.

Tribune Publishing
In January 2019, Dreier was named chairman of the board of Tribune Publishing Company, succeeding former Tribune Publishing CEO Justin Dearborn. Dreier had served on the Tribune Publishing board since 2016.

In February 2020, Dreier stepped down as chairman of the company. He left the board in June 2020.

Fallen Journalists Memorial Foundation 
On June 26, 2019, Dreier founded the Fallen Journalists Memorial Foundation (FJM Foundation), the main objective of which is to build a permanent memorial near the National Mall in Washington, D.C. to commemorate journalists who have been killed. One year earlier on June 28, 2018, the offices of Capital Gazette Communications, home to The Capital newspaper in Annapolis, Maryland, became the site of the deadliest attack against journalists in United States history when five were gunned down in their office. This mass shooting at The Capital, owned by Tribune Publishing Company, inspired Dreier to launch the FJM project. He serves as the chairman of the FJM Foundation.

Awards 
At the 5th Annual Directors Guild of America Honors Gala in 2004, Dreier and Representative Howard Berman received a DGA Honor for their efforts in fighting runaway film and television production. The award was presented by Rob Reiner, Sidney Pollack, and Warren Beatty. Also in 2004, the American Political Science Association (APSA) gave Dreier the Hubert Humphrey Award.

In 2013, Dreier was inducted into the Order of Saint Agatha as a Knight Commander by the Republic of San Marino, the world's oldest republic.

In 2017, President Enrique Peña Nieto of Mexico inducted Dreier into the Order of the Aztec Eagle. Dreier has also been awarded the Order of San Carlos by the president of Colombia and the Order of Rubén Darío by the president of Nicaragua.

Dreier is a member of the Alfalfa Club.

He has been awarded the Clean Air Award by the Sierra Club.

Personal life
Dreier lost his Malibu home in the Woolsey Fire in late 2018.

He is a descendant of Richard Bland Lee, a congressman from Virginia who served on the first Rules Committee impaneled by the House of Representatives.

According to Roll Call magazine, Dreier has a personal fortune in excess of $7.5 million and as much as $29 million, according to OpenSecrets.

See also
United States House Committee on Rules
People from Malibu, California
People from the Claremont Colleges
People from Claremont Graduate University

References

External links

 U.S. Congressman David Dreier official U.S. House website
David Dreier personal website
 
 
 Profile at Congress.org

|-

|-

|-

|-

|-

|-

1952 births
21st-century American politicians
American Christian Scientists
Businesspeople from Kansas City, Missouri
Claremont Graduate University alumni
Claremont McKenna College alumni
International Republican Institute
Living people
Politicians from Kansas City, Missouri
People from Beverly Hills, California
People from Claremont, California
People from San Dimas, California
Republican Party members of the United States House of Representatives from California